Ivan Junius Barrett (April 4, 1910 – August 16, 1999) was an American author, professor, and historian of the Church of Jesus Christ of Latter-day Saints (LDS Church).

Barrett was born in Mendon, Utah.  As a young man he served in the LDS Church's Central States Mission.  He received his bachelor's degree from Utah State University and his master's degree from Brigham Young University.  Barrett was a longtime employee of the Church Educational System filling many positions, including starting the first LDS Seminary in Nevada.

Barrett wrote Heroic Women of Mormondom; Major Lot Smith, Mormon Raider; Trumpet of God; Eph Hanks and Joseph Smith and the Restoration.

Barrett was a religion professor at Brigham Young University for 40 years, from 1953 to 1993.

In the LDS Church, Barrett served as a branch president, bishop, district president (in Israel), stake president and patriarch, among other callings.  He was also president of the Northwestern States Mission of the LDS Church from 1964 to 1966.

Barrett and his wife Minnie were the parents of five daughters.  Barrett died of a heart attack in his Orem home.

Notes

Sources
BYU Magazine letters about Berrett
Obituary, Deseret News, Aug. 18, 1999
Deseret News, Aug. 19, 1999 article on Barrett's death
Report of Barrett's being a speaker at Mendon May Day, 1959

External links 
 
 Open Library entry for Barrett

1910 births
1999 deaths
American Mormon missionaries in the United States
Brigham Young University alumni
Brigham Young University faculty
Church Educational System instructors
Historians of the Latter Day Saint movement
Mission presidents (LDS Church)
Patriarchs (LDS Church)
People from Mendon, Utah
People from Orem, Utah
Utah State University alumni
American leaders of the Church of Jesus Christ of Latter-day Saints
20th-century American historians
American male non-fiction writers
Latter Day Saints from Nevada
Latter Day Saints from Utah
20th-century American male writers